Jerry Lee Lewis is the debut album by American musician and rock and roll pioneer Jerry Lee Lewis, released in 1958 on Sun Records.

Background and content
The album featured Lewis's hit "High School Confidential", but producer Sam Phillips did not include Lewis's bigger hits such as "Great Balls of Fire" and "Whole Lotta Shakin' Going On." The album is sometimes referred to as High School Confidential.

The back cover of the LP feature a large picture of Sun Records President Sam Phillips admiring Lewis at the piano in the famous studio at 706 Union Avenue in Memphis, Tennessee. Phillips, then working to promote his latest star Lewis, also wrote the liner notes for the album noting that Lewis "is regarded as the very epitome of rock and roll"  In keeping with an occasional record industry practice of the time (1958) the album was also released in 45rpm format, the twelve songs being divided over a series of three 7" Extended Play (EP) records, Sun EPs 108,109 and 110 (pictured).  The album is currently available on CD, featuring bonus tracks from his first EP, "The Great Ball of Fire" (Sun EP 107).

Cub Koda described the selections found on Jerry Lee Lewis as "a curious mixture" with "a great deal of his best material [being] inexplicably left off", but the album still being a "terrific debut".

Track listing

References

External links

 Jerry Lee Lewis at Rate Your Music

Jerry Lee Lewis albums
1958 debut albums
Sun Records albums
Albums produced by Sam Phillips
Albums produced by Jack Clement
Albums recorded at Sun Studio